

Ludwig Schulz (4 August 1896 – 10 December 1966) was a German general during World War II, and a recipient of the Knight's Cross of the Iron Cross with Oak Leaves.

Awards
 Clasp to the Iron Cross (1939) 2nd Class (14 May 1940) 1st Class (23 May 1940)
 Knight's Cross of the Iron Cross with Oak Leaves
 Knight's Cross on 16 August 1940 as Major and commander of I./Kampfgeschwader 76
 747th Oak Leaves on 19 February 1945 as Generalmajor and of a Kampfgruppe in the Luftkriegsschule 5

References

Citations

Bibliography

 
 

1896 births
1966 deaths
People from Leszno
Luftwaffe World War II generals
People from the Province of Posen
Luftstreitkräfte personnel
20th-century Freikorps personnel
Recipients of the Knight's Cross of the Iron Cross with Oak Leaves
German prisoners of war in World War II held by the United States
Recipients of the clasp to the Iron Cross, 1st class
Major generals of the Luftwaffe